Aah is a 1953 black and white Bollywood romantic drama film starring Raj Kapoor and Nargis in lead roles. The film was produced by Raj Kapoor and directed by Raja Nawathe. This was Nawathe's first independent directorial venture. He had previously worked as assistant director to Kapoor in Aag (1948), Barsaat (1949) and Awaara (1951).

The film was rated "Below Average" at the box office but has various hit songs like "Raja Ki Aayegi Baaraat", "Aaja Re Ab Mera Dil Pukara" and "Jaane Na Nazar". The song "Chhoti Si Yeh Zindagani" sung by Mukesh was also picturised on him. Subsequently, the film was later dubbed in Tamil as Avan (Dialogues by S. D. Sundharam) and Telugu as Prema Lekhalu . The film was remade in Turkish as Ah Bu Dünya (1965), Boş Çevçere (1969).

Plot
Raj Raibahadur (Raj Kapoor) lives a wealthy lifestyle with his father, a widowed businessman. One day Raj is sent to work in the countryside, Saraswati Dam. One day, his father visits to Raj his deceased mother wished for him to marry Chandra (Vijayalaxmi), the daughter of his rich family friend. Raj decides to write a letter to Chandra, which she completely ignores. But Chandra's younger sister Neelu (Nargis) acknowledges the letter and responds to it in Chandra's name. After few letters, Raj and Neelu fall in love, but Raj is still unaware that it is Neelu who writes to him. Just then Raj is diagnosed with tuberculosis, the same disease that killed his mother. Raj decides to pretend that he never loved Neelu and also insists that she should marry his physician friend, Dr. Kailash (Pran). He also flirts with Chandra to make Neelu believe that he does not love her. Chandra decides to end the suffering of her heartbroken sister. Upon learning the truth, Neelu accepts Raj as he is. Miraculously, Raj also turns well and both lead for a happy life.

Theme and plot change
The theme of the tragic hero and the sufferings of the heroine was inspired from Sarat Chandra Chattopadhyay's famous novel Devdas, which has also been inspiration to various other films.

The end of the film originally showed Neelu marrying Dr. Kailash at Raj's insistence; Raj dies while Neelu's wedding procession is passing by. But at the premiere, Kapoor realised that this film would not work. Kapoor said 
The end of the film was then changed from a tragic one to the happy one, but the change destroyed the thematic unity of the text.  Bunny Reuben, who wrote Kapoor's biography Raj Kapoor, The Fabulous Showman, gives his rationale for the change: "The film had some of Shankar-Jaikishan's loveliest music, and a 'Devdas'-ian tragic ending which was changed to the conventional happy ending because the film didn't do well in its first release."

The Telugu dubbed version of the film Premalekhalu, 1953 was so well received that Raj Kapoor was elated and showed his gratitude for Telugu audiences by having a song in Shree 420 beginning with the lines Ramaiya Vastavaiya (Lord Ram, you will come).

Cast
 Nargis as Neelu Rai
 Raj Kapoor as Raj Raibahadur
 Vijayalaxmi as Chandra Rai
 Pran as Dr. Kailash
 Ramesh Sinha
 Bhupendra Kapoor
 Leela Mishra as Mrs. Rai
 Rashid Khan as Dr. Yusuf
 Sohanlal
 Kusum
 Mukesh as Carriage Driver (Cameo role)

Music
Composed by the musical duo Shankar Jaikishan.

Hindi songs for the film are written by Shailendra and Hasrat Jaipuri.

Tamil lyrics for the film are written by Kambadasan.

Telugu songs for the film are written by Aarudhra. Amongst them Panditlo Pellauthunnadi song is an evergreen track played at many marriage functions even today.

References

External links 
 

1953 films
1950s Hindi-language films
Films scored by Shankar–Jaikishan
R. K. Films films
1953 directorial debut films
Films directed by Raja Nawathe
Hindi films remade in other languages
Hindi-language romance films
Indian romantic drama films
1953 romantic drama films
Indian black-and-white films